Andrew Lloyd Webber's Requiem is a requiem mass, which premiered in 1985. It was written in memory of the composer's father, William Lloyd Webber, who died in 1982.

History and reception

It was a new venture for Lloyd Webber, the composer of numerous musicals, to create a piece of traditional classical music. The music mixes Lloyd Webber's melodic and pop-oriented style with more complex, sophisticated, and at times even austere forms.

An initial draft of Requiem was heard during the 1984 Sydmonton Festival, after which Lloyd Webber spent an additional half-year polishing the work. The premiere took place on 24 February 1985 in St. Thomas Church, New York; the conductor was Lorin Maazel, and the three soloists were Plácido Domingo, Sarah Brightman (Lloyd Webber's wife at the time), and Paul Miles-Kingston.

Requiem won the 1986 Grammy Award for Best Classical Contemporary Composition. The most popular segment of Requiem has been the Pie Jesu, which became a hit single and has been recorded by numerous artists.

On 20 July 2013, Lorin Maazel revisited Requiem at The Castleton Festival. Featured performers were soprano Joyce El-Khoury, tenor Tyler Nelson, and treble Tommy Richman.

Pie Jesu
The best-known part of Lloyd Webber's Requiem, the "Pie Jesu" segment, combines the traditional Pie Jesu text with that of the Agnus Dei from later in the standard Requiem Mass. It was originally performed by Sarah Brightman, who premiered the selection in 1985 in a duet with boy soprano Paul Miles-Kingston; a music video of their duet was created as well. The performance by Brightman and Miles-Kingston was a certified Silver hit in the UK in 1985. Brightman later rerecorded the track for her Classics album in 2001.

Pie Jesu has since been recorded frequently outside of the parent Requiem. Notable solo artists include Sarah Brightman, Jackie Evancho, Sissel Kyrkjebø, Marie Osmond, Anna Netrebko, Amira Willighagen and Michelle Bass. Charlotte Church sang it on her best-selling debut album, Voice of an Angel (1998). Angelis, a children's choir, sang it on their eponymous debut album Angelis (2006). Moe Koffman recorded the Pie Jesu on his recently re-issued album Music for the Night (1991) with Doug Riley.

The Pie Jesu was voted number 91 in the Classic 100 Twentieth Century countdown in 2011 on the Australian ABC Classic FM radio station.

In his Requiem, Lloyd Webber combined the text of the traditional Pie Jesu with that of the version of the Agnus Dei formerly appointed to be used at Requiem Masses:

Scoring and structure
The work is scored for chorus, three soloists (tenor, soprano, treble) and a large orchestra that includes organ, drum kit, and synthesizer.

Instrumentation
Voices: tenor, soprano, and treble soloists, and SATB choir (performed with boy sopranos and altos at the premiere)
Woodwinds: 2 flutes (1st doubling alto flute, 2nd doubling piccolo and alto flute), 2 oboes (1st doubling oboe d'amore, 2nd doubling English horn), 2 clarinets (1st doubling E-flat clarinet, 2nd doubling bass clarinet), 2 saxophones (1st doubling soprano and tenor saxophones and alto flute, 2nd doubling alto and baritone saxophones and clarinet), 2 bassoons, and contrabassoon
Brass: 4 horns, 3 trumpets, and 4 trombones
Percussion: timpani & 4 percussionists playing side drum, bass drum, cymbals, triangle, small, medium, large and deep suspended cymbals, tambourine, deep military side drum, small ratchet rattle, glockenspiel, xylophone, gong, large gong, small bell, bells, chimes, bell tree, wood block, congas, maracas, marimba, high rototom, drum kit
Keyboards: piano (doubling celesta), synthesizer, and organ
Strings: harp, violas, violoncellos, and double basses

Structure
As is usual, Lloyd Webber did not set the Gradual and Tract texts of the Mass. He divides the Sanctus between two movements, including the Hosanna part with the Benedictus. He does not set the Agnus Dei separately, but rather combined the text of Pie Jesu, a motet derived from the final couplet of the usual Dies irae, with that of the Agnus Dei, commonly heard later in the standard Requiem Mass. He includes a text from the burial service, Libera me.

Introit – Kyrie
Sequence:
Dies irae
Recordare
Ingemisco
Offertory – Sanctus: Sanctus
Sanctus: Hosanna – Benedictus
Pie Jesu
Communion – Libera me

References

External links
 Pie Jesu from Lloyd Webber's Requiem, sung by Jackie Evancho at Disney's Magic Kingdom, December 2010
Pie Jesu from Lloyd Webber's Requiem, sung by Sissel Kyrkjebø at Oslo Spectrum, Norway November 2002

Compositions by Andrew Lloyd Webber
Music for orchestra and organ
1985 compositions
Lloydwebber